Local elections were held in Montenegro on 4 February 2018 for the municipalities of Berane and Ulcinj, and on 20 and 27 May in 11 municipalities, including the capital city Podgorica.

Results

February elections (Berane and Ulcinj)

Berane

Ulcinj

May elections (11 municipalities)

Plužine

Bar

Bijelo Polje

Danilovgrad

Kolašin

Plav

Pljevlja

Podgorica

Golubovci, Podgorica

Rožaje

Šavnik

Žabljak

References

2018 elections in Europe
2018 in Montenegro
February 2018 events in Europe
May 2018 events in Europe
Local elections in Montenegro